This is a list of metropolitan areas in Middle East, with their population according to different sources. The list includes metropolitan areas that have a population of over 1.5 million.

List

See also 
List of cities of the ancient Near East
List of largest cities in the Arab world
List of largest cities in the Levant region by population
List of Middle Eastern countries by population

References

External links 
Where are the largest cities in the Middle East?. City Monitor

Middle East
Lists of cities by population
Lists of cities by demography
Metropolitan areas